Edward Kimble Valentine (June 1, 1843 – April 11, 1916) was an American Republican Party politician.

Biography
Born in Keosauqua, Iowa, he attended common schools and learned to become a printer. During the Civil War he was a member in the Union army served in the Illinois Volunteer Infantry in the Sixty-seventh Regiment. He was promoted to second lieutenant and then honorably discharged. He reenlisted in the spring of 1863 as a  private in the Seventh Iowa Volunteer Cavalry. He was promoted to adjutant of the regiment and served until 1866.

He settled in Omaha, Nebraska, in 1866. He was appointed register of the United States land office in West Point, Nebraska, serving from May 17, 1869, to September 30, 1871. He studied law and was admitted to the bar in 1869, setting up practice in West Point.

He was elected judge to the sixth judicial district in 1875. He ran in Nebraska at-large for the Forty-sixth and Forty-seventh congress, being elected as a Republican both times. He was elected to the newly created 3rd district of Nebraska to the Forty-eighth Congresses. In all he served from March 4, 1879, to March 3, 1885. During his time in the Forty-seventh Congress he was the chairman of the U.S. House Committee on Agriculture. He declined to be a candidate for renomination in 1884. He was the United States Senate Sergeant at Arms from June 30, 1890, to August 6, 1893. After that he resumed practicing law in West Point. He retired to Chicago, Illinois, in 1908, where he later died. He was buried in Union Ridge Cemetery, Norwood Park, Illinois.

Honors
Valentine, Nebraska, is named for him.

See also

References

Notes
 
  Retrieved on 2008-02-15
 

1843 births
1916 deaths
Politicians from Chicago
People from Keosauqua, Iowa
People from Cherry County, Nebraska
People of Illinois in the American Civil War
People of Iowa in the American Civil War
Sergeants at Arms of the United States Senate
Nebraska state court judges
Union Army officers
Illinois Republicans
Republican Party members of the United States House of Representatives from Nebraska
19th-century American politicians
People from West Point, Nebraska
19th-century American judges